SLIT and NTRK-like protein 2 is a protein that in humans is encoded by the SLITRK2 gene.

Function 

Members of the SLITRK family, such as SLITRK2, are integral membrane proteins with 2 N-terminal leucine-rich repeat (LRR) domains similar to those of SLIT proteins (see SLIT1; MIM 603742). Most SLITRKs, including SLITRK2, also have C-terminal regions that share homology with neurotrophin receptors (see NTRK1; MIM 191315). SLITRKs are expressed predominantly in neural tissues and have neurite-modulating activity.

References

Further reading